The 2016–17 Miami RedHawks women's basketball team will represent Miami University during the 2016–17 NCAA Division I women's basketball season. The RedHawks, led by fourth year head coach Cleve Wright, will play their home games at Millett Hall, as members of the East Division of the Mid-American Conference.

Schedule

|-
!colspan=9 style="background:#CE1126; color:white;"| Non-conference regular season

|-
!colspan=9 style="background:#CE1126; color:white;"| MAC regular season

|-
!colspan=9 style="background:#CE1126; color:white;"| MAC Tournament

See also
2016–17 Miami RedHawks men's basketball team

References

Miami
Miami RedHawks women's basketball seasons